The 1972 Eisenhower Trophy took place 18 to 21 October at the Olivos Golf Club in Buenos Aires, Argentina. It was the eighth World Amateur Team Championship for the Eisenhower Trophy. The tournament was a 72-hole stroke play team event with 32 four-man teams. The best three scores for each round counted towards the team total.

The United States won the Eisenhower Trophy for the third successive time, finishing five strokes ahead of the silver medalists, Australia. South Africa took the bronze medal while Spain finished fourth. Tony Gresham from Australia had the lowest individual score, one-over-par 285, two strokes better than two Americans, Ben Crenshaw and Vinny Giles.

Teams
32 four-man teams contested the event.

Scores

Source:

Individual leaders
There was no official recognition for the lowest individual scores.

Source:

References

External links
Record Book on International Golf Federation website

Eisenhower Trophy
Golf tournaments in Argentina
Eisenhower Trophy
Eisenhower Trophy
Eisenhower Trophy